Aznar is a Spanish and Gascon surname of Basque origin and an obsolete given name. It probably stems from old Basque "azenar(i)" ('fox', modern "azeri"). Notable people with this name include the following:

Surname 
 Juan Bautista Aznar-Cabañas (1860–1933), Spanish politician and prime minister briefly in 1931
 José María Aznar (born 1953), Spanish politician, conservative prime minister
 Emmanuel Aznar (1915–1970), French footballer
 Manuel Aznar Acedo (1916–2001), Spanish journalist and radio broadcaster
 Manuel Aznar Zubigaray (1894–1975), Spanish diplomat and journalist
 Pedro Aznar (born 1959), Argentine musician

Given name 
 Aznar Sánchez (died 836), Duke of Gascony
 Aznar Galíndez I (died 839), Count of Aragón, Conflent, Cerdagne and Urgel
 Aznar Galíndez II (died 893), Count of Aragón

See also

References 

Spanish masculine given names
Spanish-language surnames